Giacobbe Fragomeni (born 13 August 1969) is an Italian professional boxer. He held the WBC cruiserweight title from 2008 to 2009, and the European Union cruiserweight title from 2007 to 2008. As an amateur he won a bronze medal at the 1997 World Championships and gold at the 1998 European Championships, both in the heavyweight division. Outside of boxing, Fragomeni won the 2016 edition of the Italian reality TV show L'Isola dei Famosi.

Professional career
Fragomeni made his professional debut on 19 May 2001, winning a four-round points decision against Henry Kolle Njume. Having won his next twenty fights, Fragomeni lost for the first time against European cruiserweight champion (and future heavyweight world champion) David Haye on 17 November 2006. This was a grudge match from their amateur days, as Fragomeni had defeated Haye in the final qualifiers for the 2000 Olympics. Fragomeni bounced back by winning the vacant European Union cruiserweight title with a unanimous decision (UD) over Vincenzo Rossitto on 31 July 2007, and went on to make two successful defences.

On 24 October 2008, Fragomeni won the vacant WBC cruiserweight title after a sixth-round technical decision against Rudolf Kraj. Their fight was stopped due to Fragomeni receiving a cut over the eye from an accidental headbutt by Kraj in round five. His first defence of the title, against Krzysztof Włodarczyk on 16 May 2009, ended in a split draw despite Fragomeni suffering two knockdowns but only one of them being considered legal by the referee. Fragomeni was not as fortunate in his next defence, on 21 November 2009, when he lost a very close majority decision to undefeated former light-heavyweight world champion Zsolt Erdei.

A rematch with Włodarczyk on 15 May 2010, almost exactly a year after their first fight, saw Fragomeni lose by stoppage in the eighth round. The WBC cruiserweight title, vacated by Erdei, was again at stake. A third fight between the two took place on 6 December 2013, with Włodarczyk's WBC title on the line once more. This time, Fragomeni was forced to retire in his corner after six largely one-sided rounds due to a cut which was caused by an accidental punch from Włodarczyk on the break.

Professional boxing record

References

External links

1969 births
Living people
Boxers at the 2000 Summer Olympics
Olympic boxers of Italy
Boxers from Milan
Italian male boxers
AIBA World Boxing Championships medalists
Participants in Italian reality television series
World Boxing Council champions
World cruiserweight boxing champions
Heavyweight boxers
Reality show winners
Mediterranean Games gold medalists for Italy
Mediterranean Games medalists in boxing
Competitors at the 1997 Mediterranean Games